Circling: 1978-1987 (Krugovanje) is a 1993 poetry collection by the Serbian-American poet Dejan Stojanović (1959). It contains 56 poems in six sequences: "Recircling," "Light Bugs," "A Conversations with Atoms," "A Grain," "A Warden with no Keys," and "Darkness Is Waiting." Sequence, "A Grain," was added to the third edition published in 2000 by Narodna knjiga–Alfa, Beograd.

References

External links
Amazon
Open Library

2012 poetry books
American poetry collections